The 1945–46 season was Newport County's first full season since the 1938–39 season. The club competed in the Football League South, a temporary division consisting of the half of the First and Second Division teams geographically farthest south.

Season review

Results summary 
Note: Two points for a win

Fixtures and results

Football League South

FA Cup

References

 Amber in the Blood: A History of Newport County.

External links
 Newport County 1945-1946 : Results
 Newport County football club match record: 1946

1945-46
English football clubs 1945–46 season
1945–46 in Welsh football